The Shia Crescent (or Shiite Crescent) is the notionally crescent-shaped region of the Middle East where the majority population is Shia or where there is a strong Shia minority in the population.

In recent years the term has come to identify areas under Iranian influence or control, as Iran has sought to unite all Shia Muslims under one banner. On the other hand, this concept shows the increasing political weight of Shia in the Middle East.

Areas in the Shia Crescent include Lebanon, Syria, Bahrain, Iraq, Iran, Azerbaijan, Yemen, and western Afghanistan. In addition to the Twelver Shia, the term also includes Ismaili, Zaydi, Syrian Alawite, and Bektashi groups in Turkey.

Overview

The term was coined in 2004 by King Abdullah II of Jordan at a time when Iran was reportedly interfering in Iraq in the run-up to the January 2005 parliamentary elections.  This was in the context of a threatened, later realised, boycott of the elections by Sunnis in Iraq potentially leading to a Shia-dominated government and the assumption that a Shia Iraq might fall under the influence of Shia Iran.  The suggestion was that the common religion gives good potential for cooperation between Iran, Iraq, Alawite-dominated Syria and the politically powerful Shia militia Hezbollah in Lebanon; as well, the suggestion was that these others would be proxies for Iran in a regional power play.

The term has developed since to encompass other Shia areas of the Middle East.  The nations where Shia Muslims form a dominant majority are Iran and Iraq.  Shias also represent a large majority in Azerbaijan, however it is constitutionally a secular state. Those who are actual practicing adherents are much lower, which has led to them generally being excluded from the crescent.  Shia are also the majority of citizens in Bahrain, however the government is largely Sunni. Large Shia minorities also exist in Lebanon, Kuwait, Yemen, Saudi Arabia, Turkey, Afghanistan, Pakistan, India and to a lesser extent, UAE. Excepting Lebanon, where the weak central government structure of Lebanon has allowed Hezbollah to become involved in the Syrian civil war,  these are not usually described as part of the crescent.

Ayatollah Khamenei, the Supreme Leader of the Islamic Republic of Iran, in a speech on June 5, 2005, on the anniversary of Ayatollah Khomeini's death, cited the "Shia Crescent" project as evidence of a policy of religious divisiveness. In 29th International Islamic Unity Conference in Tehran on December 27, 2015, Iranian President Hassan Rouhani called on Muslim countries to unite and strive to improve Islam’s public image, adding that "There is neither a Shiite nor a Sunni crescent. We have an Islamic moon. We, Muslims, are in a world where we must be united". Noam Chomsky, an American university professor and linguist, in his book, A Plan for the Future, Occupations, Interventions, Empire, and Sustainability, claims that most of the Middle East's energy reserves lie in the so-called "Shiite Crescent" Iran's influence in the Shiite Crescent challenges US efforts to control Middle East energy resources. Washington's nightmare is for a Shiite coalition to take control of the world's most important oil reserves independently of the United States.

In January 2016, a confidant of Saudi Crown Prince Mohammad bin Salman claimed that the Arab world was confronted "by a Shia full moon”, rather than just a Shia Crescent, as a result of the expanded activities of Iranian-backed Shia militias in countries such as Iraq, Syria and Yemen. In December 2017, Mohammad Ali Jafari, the chief of the Islamic Revolutionary Guard Corps (IRGC), said that "Today, armed cells of resistance have been established in Islamic countries, and small networks of resistance have been created in other countries, and we will see their influence in the future.” According to him, large forces of volunteers have joined the "anti-terror" struggle in Syria. Jafari had also previously talked about the regime's need to create a Shia Islamist bloc loyal to Iran.

In 2014, Qods Force Chief Qassem Suleimani outlined Ali Khameini's strategy of toppling the Arab governments through military insurgencies waged by Iran-backed Khomeinist militants. Explaining that Iran's goal was to occupy "70 percent of the world's oil", Suleimani stated: "The revival of Shia under the leadership of Iran creates a polarity and power for Iran, which has a political dimension and also a security dimension and also an economic dimension .... We know that three countries Iran, Saudi Arabia, and Iraq contain the most oil in the world. [Saudi] Arabia is first, Iran and Iraq are second and third, and that approximately 70 percent of the worlds oil is located where the Shia live or about 80 percent is where the Shia live. Iraq's oil is in this corridor between Basra and Baghdad; Kuwait, and [Saudi] Arabia, which 80 percent of its oil is located in the Shia-populated places like Damam [and] Qatif, and it is also clear for Iran. The political leadership of Shiism exponentially adds to Iran's ethnic power."

Demographic transformations and Shiization
In 2017 or later, Hussain Ibrahim Qutrib, an Associate Professor of Geomorphology at the King Faisal Center for Research and Islamic Studies, wrote an article about the demographic changes that have occurred in "Useful Syria" as a result of the Syrian Civil War. Specifically, Qutrib defined "Useful Syria" similar to how Syrian President Bashar al-Assad defined this term in early 2016—as in, including the Syrian governorates of Damascus, Rif Dimashq, Homs, Hama, Latakia, and Tartus.

Qutrib pointed out that these six governorates contained 46% of Syria's total population at the end of 2011—as in, 9.8 million people out of a total Syrian population of almost 21.4 million people at that point in time. Qutrib points out that, at the end of 2011, the demographics of "Useful Syria" were 69% Sunni, 21% Alawite (which is an offshoot of Shi'a Islam), 1% Shi'a, 1% Druze, 2% Ismaili, and 6% Christian.

In contrast, by 2016, the population of "Useful Syria" fell from 9.8 million to 7.6 million but its demographics have also significantly changed in the intervening five years; in 2016, "Useful Syria" was just 52% Sunni, 24% Alawite, 13% Shi'a, 1% Druze, 3% Ismaili, and 7% Christian—with the main change being the explosive growth of the Shi'a population in "Useful Syria" between 2011 and 2016.

The demographic transformations in Rif Dimashq and Homs governorate between 2011 and 2016 were especially notable: Rif Dimashq went from 87% Sunni in 2011 to 54% Sunni in 2016 while the Homs governorate went from 64% Sunni to 21% Sunni between 2011 and 2016. This demographic transformation has been described by Qutrib as Shiization.

See also
Shia topics
 Iran–Saudi Arabia proxy conflict
 Axis of Resistance
 Shia–Sunni relations
 Shia Islam: Demographics (For current estimates of Shia proportion of population)
Geography topics
 Fertile Crescent
 Mesopotamia

References

External links 
 The Myth of the Shia Crescent, Project Syndicate (May 2008)
 When the Shia Rise, Foreign Affairs (July/August 2006)
 Shia Crescent on Facebook, (Research from Shia point of view 2014)

Middle East
Shia Islam
Regions of Asia